Dryocopus is a genus of large powerful woodpeckers, typically 35–45 cm in length. It has representatives in North and South America, Europe, and Asia; some South American species are endangered. It was believed to be closely related to the American genus Campephilus, but it is part of a different lineage of woodpeckers altogether (Benz et al., 2006)

Their breeding habitat is forested areas with large trees, where they nest in a large cavity in a dead tree or a dead part of a tree. They may excavate a new hole each year, creating habitat for other large cavity nesting birds. They are non-migratory permanent residents.

They are mainly black in plumage with red on the crown of the head, often as a crest. Most species also have some white areas of plumage, especially on the head, and some have additional red facial markings.

The male, female and juvenile plumages of each species usually differ, often in the extent of red on the crown and elsewhere on the head. The flight is strong and direct, and the calls are typically loud wild laughs. The drumming of these large birds can be heard from a great distance.

Dryocopus woodpeckers chip out large holes with their strong bills while searching out insects, especially beetle larvae in trees. They will also take fruits, berries, and nuts.

Taxonomy
The genus Dryocopus was introduced by the German naturalist Friedrich Boie in 1826. The name is from the Ancient Greek word for a woodpecker druokopos combining   "tree" and  "beating". The genus forms part of the woodpecker subfamily Picinae and has a sister relationship to the genus Mulleripicus whose species are found in South and Southeast Asia. The genus Dryocopus is a member of the tribe Picini and belongs to a clade that contains five genera: Colaptes, Piculus, Mullerpics, Dryocopus and Celeus.

The genus contains six species.

References

Sources
 
 Gorman, Gerard (2004): Woodpeckers of Europe: A Study of the European Picidae. Bruce Coleman, UK. .
 Gorman, Gerard (2011): The Black Woodpecker: A monograph on Dryocopus martius. Lynx Edicions, Barcelona. .
 Grimmett, Richard; Inskipp, Carol & Inskipp, Tim (1999): Birds of India, Pakistan, Nepal, Bangladesh, Bhutan, Sri Lanka, and the Maldives. Princeton University Press, Princeton, N.J.. 

 
Bird genera